Michael J. Doherty (born May 24, 1963) is an American Republican Party politician who has served as the surrogate of Warren County, New Jersey since November 30, 2022. He previously served in the New Jersey Senate representing the 23rd Legislative District. He was sworn into the State Senate on November 23, 2009, having won the seat held by Marcia A. Karrow, who had earlier been selected by a party convention to succeed Leonard Lance after his election to the United States House of Representatives. Doherty served in the New Jersey General Assembly from 2002 to 2009.

Early life 
Doherty was born in Point Pleasant, New Jersey and resides in Washington Township, Warren County, New Jersey. Doherty grew up in Glen Ridge, New Jersey and graduated from Glen Ridge High School in 1981.

In 1985, Doherty graduated with a B.S. from the United States Military Academy at West Point, and was commissioned as an officer in the Field Artillery. Doherty served on active duty in the United States Army from 1985–89 and in the United States Army Reserve from 1989–93, achieving the rank of captain. He is a graduate of the United States Army Airborne School, the U.S. Army Jungle School and the Defense Language Institute (German). In the Army, he was stationed in Germany and served as a nuclear operations officer. His unit's mission was to utilize nuclear armed missiles to defend Western Europe and NATO forces from possible Soviet aggression. He was granted a Top Secret clearance to perform his nuclear duties.

Doherty and his wife, Linda, have three sons, who have served or are serving on active duty in different branches of the armed forces: Matthew, U.S. Army; Ryan, U.S. Marine Corps; and Jared, U.S. Air Force.

In 1993, he was awarded a J.D. from the Seton Hall University School of Law.  Doherty is a patent attorney, specializing in semiconductor and medical device technology.

Warren County Board of County Commissioners 
Doherty served on the Warren County Board of County Commissioners from the 1st district . In 2000, he defeated the incumbent Freeholder Director, a Democrat, to capture control of the Freeholder Board for the Republican Party.  In 2001, he served as deputy director of the Freeholder Board. He was elected to serve as the Director of the Board in both 2002 and 2003.

Doherty also began a program to reduce the county debt. He prevailed in a showdown with a Superior Court judge who threatened to jail Doherty unless he issued $5 million in bonds to fund an expansion of Warren County Community College. The New Jersey Supreme Court sided with Doherty and held that the Freeholder Board was correct to ignore the judge's order.

New Jersey Assembly 
Doherty was elected to the New Jersey General Assembly in 2001, and was re-elected in 2003, 2005 and 2007.  He served in the Assembly on the Appropriations Committee and the Labor Committee.  Early in his Assembly career, he served on the Agriculture Committee, the Housing and the Local Government Committee, and the State House Commission.

New Jersey Senate 
In November 2008, Doherty announced his intention to run for the State Senate seat vacated by Leonard Lance, who was elected to represent the 7th congressional district in the United States House of Representatives.

Doherty's opponent in the race was Assemblywoman Marcia A. Karrow. Hunterdon County Freeholder Matt Holt originally planned to run for the vacancy as well, but he dropped out to run for one of the Assembly vacancies opened up by Karrow or Doherty.

On January 24, 2009, a special election was held by a convention of Republican committee members from Hunterdon and Warren counties. Karrow defeated Doherty in the special election by a margin of 195 votes to 143. Doherty announced that he would run against Karrow a second time in the June 2009 primary, when she would be running as the incumbent. Doherty gave up his Assembly seat by opposing Karrow in the primary.  On June 2, 2009, Doherty defeated Karrow in the Republican Senate primary by a margin of 52%-48%.

He defeated the Democratic candidate Harvey Baron in a special election on November 3, 2009, to fill the remaining two years of the Senate term, garnering 71% of the vote. He was first sworn into his Senate seat on November 23, 2009.  In the Senate for the 2018-19 session, Doherty serves on the Education Committee and the Judiciary Committee. Doherty was re-elected to the Senate in November 2011, 2013 and 2017 by wide margins.

In September 2022, Doherty announced that he would retire from the Senate to seek the Warren County Surrogate’s Office. Former State GOP Chairman Doug Steinhardt announced that he would run in a special election convention in for the vacated senate seat; Doherty endorsed Steinhardt as his successor.

Committees 
Judiciary
Education

2012 U.S. Senate election 
There had been speculation that Doherty would run against incumbent Bob Menendez for United States Senator. Assemblyman John DiMaio from the same legislative district as Doherty has said he would endorse Doherty if he ran. In February 2012, Doherty announced his support for Joseph M. Kyrillos for the Republican nomination for the 2012 U.S. Senate race.

Electoral history

New Jersey Senate

New Jersey Assembly

References

External links
Senator Michael Doherty's Official Website
Senator Doherty's legislative web page, New Jersey Legislature
New Jersey Legislature financial disclosure forms - 2016 2015 2014 2013 2012 2011 2010 2009 2008 2007 2006 2005 2004
Senator Michael J. Doherty, Project Vote Smart

|-

|-

1963 births
Defense Language Institute alumni
Living people
County commissioners in New Jersey
Glen Ridge High School alumni
New Jersey lawyers
Republican Party New Jersey state senators
Politicians from Warren County, New Jersey
Republican Party members of the New Jersey General Assembly
American patent attorneys
People from Glen Ridge, New Jersey
People from Point Pleasant, New Jersey
People from Washington Township, Warren County, New Jersey
Seton Hall University School of Law alumni
United States Army officers
United States Military Academy alumni
21st-century American politicians
Military personnel from New Jersey